The 1980–81 County Championship was the 39th season of the Liga IV, the fourth tier of the Romanian football league system. The champions of each county association play against one from a neighboring county in a play-off  to gain promotion to Divizia C.

Promotion play-off 
Teams promoted to Divizia C without a play-off matches as teams from less represented counties in the third division.

 (SM) Chimia Tășnad
 (SJ) Silvania Cehu Silvaniei
 (BZ) Chimia Buzău
 (VS) Metalul Huși

 (BR) Autobuzul Făurei
 (GR) Petrolul Roata de Jos
 (CV) Metalul Sfântu Gheorghe

 Ilfov County did not enter a team in the play-offs.

The matches was played on 5 and 12 July 1981.

County leagues

Arad County

Hunedoara County

Olt County 
North Series

South Series

Championship final 

Victoria Caracal won the 1980–81 Olt County Championship and qualify for promotion play-off in Divizia C.

See also 

 1980–81 Divizia A
 1980–81 Divizia B
 1980–81 Divizia C

References

External links
 

Liga IV seasons
4
Romania